The ranks in the Chinese People's Liberation Army Air Force are similar to those of the Chinese Army, formally known as the People's Liberation Army Ground Force, except that those of the PLA Air Force are prefixed by 空军 (Kong Jun) meaning Air Force.  See Ranks of the People's Liberation Army or the article on an individual rank for details on the evolution of rank and insignia in the PLAAF.  This article primarily covers the existing ranks and insignia.

Current ranks

Ranks of officers
The current system of officer ranks and insignia dates from 1988 and is a revision of the ranks and insignia used from 1955 to 1965. The rank of Kong Jun Yi Ji Shang Jiang (First Class General) was never held and was abolished in 1994.

Ranks of Enlisted Personnel
The current system of enlisted ranks and insignia dates from 2009.

Unlike NATO countries, new recruits of the People's Liberation Army have no military ranks before the boot camp is completed, and they will be awarded the rank of Private/Seaman Apprentice/Airman (All collectively called "Private" or "Lie Bing" in the Chinese Language) after they have graduated from the boot camp. According to Article 16 of Chapter 3 of the "Regulations on the Service of Active Soldiers of the Chinese People's Liberation Army", "The lowest enlisted rank is Private".

Civilian cadre badges 
The current PLA Air Force 07-style uniform has special provisions for the epaulettes of non-combat troops, that is, civilian cadres, guards of honor, and military bands. Among them, the badge of the guard of honor shown in the figure was abolished in 2014.

Historical rank insignia 
Officer ranks

Enlisted and NCOs 
Type 55

Type 88

References

External links 
 Military ranks of the People's Liberation Army Air Force

See also 
 Republic of China Air Force rank insignia

Military ranks of the People's Republic of China
People's Liberation Army Air Force
People's Liberation Army Air Force
Air force ranks